MRFC may refer to:

Rugby union 
Malvern RFC
Medicals RFC
Melbourne Rugby Football Club
Moseley Rugby Football Club
München RFC

Football 
 Maine Road F.C.
 Mid Rhondda F.C.
 Montrose Roselea F.C.

Other uses 
 Media Resource Function controller, a component of the Media Resource Function, defined by the IP Multimedia Subsystem (IMS) standard
 Mixed reactant fuel cell, a type of Membraneless Fuel Cells